Phagoburn was a European Union-financed phase I/II clinical study focused on testing the medical uses of bacteriophage for treating wounds that ran from 2013 to 2017. The main objective of Phagoburn was to assess the safety, effectiveness and pharmacodynamics of two therapeutic phage cocktails to treat Escherichia coli and Pseudomonas aeruginosa burn wound infections. Pherecydes Pharma was the main sponsor.

The trial was performed in nine hospitals in France and Belgium. A total of 27 patients was included, with 13 randomised to receive phage therapy and the remainder standard treatment. The trial was terminated early because the phage therapy proved less effective than standard treatment at reducing the number of bacteria. The authors concluded that the low concentration of phage tested was insufficient. The primary cause of a lower than expected phage concentration was due to storage instability of the bacteriophages used in the cocktail.

See also
 Phage therapy

References

External links
 Main website

Clinical trials
Bacteriophages